Les Amery (17 December 1934 – 19 April 1999) was  a former Australian rules footballer who played with Richmond in the Victorian Football League (VFL).

Notes

External links 		
		
		
		
		
		
		
		
1934 births		
1999 deaths		
Australian rules footballers from Victoria (Australia)		
Richmond Football Club players
Melton Football Club players